Jadwin is a surname. Notable people with the surname include:

Cornelius Comegys Jadwin (1835–1913), American politician
Edgar Jadwin (1865–1931, United States Army general

See also 
Jadwin, Missouri, is an unincorporated community in southern Dent County, Missouri, United States
Jadwin Gymnasium, is a multi-purpose arena at Princeton University in Princeton, New Jersey